Black Belt (2007), known as  in Japan, is a Japanese film directed by Shunichi Nagasaki. It focuses mainly on the martial art of Karate. It is notable for excluding the usual exaggerations of the genre. The lead roles were played by karate experts, and no special effects were used.

Plot

The events take place in 1932 in Japanese-occupied Manchuria, in which the corrupt leaders of the Japanese army are trying to take over all the Karate dojos /training halls for their own benefit. The master Eiken Shibahara (Yosuke Natsuki), from one of these dojo located on the southernmost Japanese island of Kyushu, dies before passing on the Kuroobi/ black belt to his successor. Three of his pupils: Taikan (Tatsuya Naka 7th Dan JKA Shotokan karate), Giryu (Akihito Yagi 7th Dan Meibukan Gōjū-ryū Karate) and Choei (Yuji Suzuki, 1st Dan Kyokushin karate), have the task of deciding amongst themselves who deserves it most. 

After they bury their master, they are forced to leave the dojo and join the Japanese army. At this point, their journeys lead them on different paths both in life and in the understanding of their master's teachings of martial arts. They are reunited in the end, to battle together against corruption and uphold tradition.

Cast
 Akihito Yagi - Giryu
 Tatsuya Naka - Taikan
 Yuji Suzuki - Choei
 Yosuke Natsuki - Sensei Eiken Shibahara
 Fuyuhiko Nishi - Sensei Takaomi Togo
 Shinya Owada - General Hidehisa Goda
 Takayasu Komiya - Ohmoji
 Hakuryu - Captain Kiichi Tanihara
 Tarō Suwa - Kenkichi
 Arashi Fukasawa - Kenta
 Narumi Konno - Hana
 Kimika Yoshino - Chiyo

References

External links
 

2007 films
2007 martial arts films
2000s Japanese-language films
Karate films
Japanese martial arts films
Films set in Japan
Films set in China
Second Sino-Japanese War films
Martial arts tournament films
Films scored by Naoki Satō
2000s Japanese films